The Dancing Masters is a 1943 black and white American comedy film directed by Malcolm St. Clair, produced by 20th Century-Fox, and featuring Laurel and Hardy. A young Robert Mitchum has a small, uncredited role as a gangster posing as an insurance salesman.

Plot
Dancing instructors Laurel and Hardy accept a phoney insurance deal from two gangsters posing as insurance salesman. At the same time, Grant Lawrence, a young inventor is working on creating a new invisible ray machine that will revolutionize jungle warfare for World War II. Trudy Harlan, Grant's girlfriend and one of Stan's dancing pupils, invites Grant and the boys to her house for tea when her parents are away. Trudy's father Wentworth Harlan almost discovers Stan and Ollie when he returns home but finds Grant and angrily confronts him. Grant is ordered to leave and never talk to Trudy again, while the boys narrowly escape being found by Trudy's parents once again.

The next morning, Stan and Ollie are confronted by their angry landlord Mr. Featherstone to pay the rent on their dancing school by twelve noon that day or else face eviction. When Ollie declares that he has not got the money to the pay the rent, Stan suggests paying the rent with Ollie's nest-egg money. Although he initially refuses, Ollie eventually gives in and reluctantly decides to draw the money out of the bank. On their way to pay the rent, however, the boys become sidetracked by an auction that they are passing. In a situation reminiscent of Thicker Than Water, the boys keep bidding against each other for an antique grandfather clock, which they were merely initially wanting to purchase for a lady who had left her money at home. While crossing the street with the clock, Stan trips and his hat falls off. The boys lay the clock down in the middle of the street while Stan retrieves his hat, but the clock is destroyed by a passing truck.

Back home, Stan and Ollie decide to help Grant promote his invisible ray gun, by means of Stan posing as the inventor, an eccentric foreign scientist, and with Grant later revealing himself as the real inventor. Although the demonstration is a success at first, Stan forgets to turn the machine off after firing it and it explodes. Grant is dismayed at the destruction of his invention, but the demonstration has earned him the approval and respect of Mr. Harlan.

In desperate need of money, Ollie decides to inflict a series of accidents upon Stan (using the fake insurance document) in hopes of raising money, but these events backfire and Ollie ends up receiving the intended consequence. Meanwhile, Mr. Harlan disapproves of his friend George Worthing (whom he had at first hoped to marry Trudy) attempting to steal Grant's invention and orders him to leave their home. He also decides to finance Grant's inventions following the demonstration of the invisible ray gun, much to the delight of Trudy and Grant.

Ollie decides to cause Stan to have another accident after hearing from a hospital patient who had gained insurance money after standing up on a roller-coaster and suffering an injury. Stan and Ollie board a bus to the beach, but the bus driver and passengers flee from the bus mid-journey after a cake-eating (and apparently rabid) dog frightens them away. Stan manages to escape from the bus just outside a coastal amusement park and pokes his head through a target in one of the amusement games. However, Ollie has had his foot caught and is stuck at the top of the bus as it careers onto a roller-coaster track. Ollie rides the bus along the roller-coaster track (while Stan gets pelted at the target) before the bus careers off the track just before a sharp turn.

With his leg broken as a result of the bus accident, Ollie ends up in the hospital and is visited by Trudy, Grant and Stan. In the film's final moment, Ollie states that his foot has gone to sleep. Stan asks in a whisper if there is anything he can do to make Ollie comfortable. When Ollie asks Stan why he is whispering, Stan answers, "I didn't want to wake your foot up."

Cast

Reception
Just before The Dancing Masters was released, Twentieth Century-Fox announced a new policy discontinuing all low-budget B pictures. The Dancing Masters, the last B on the schedule, was heavily edited down to 63 minutes. Despite the unusually short running time, the film was exceptionally well received in movie theaters, becoming Fox's third-biggest box-office hit of the year. It ultimately ranked #20 in the list of highest-grossing films of 1943. Owing entirely to Laurel & Hardy, Fox abandoned its new policy and reinstated the B pictures.

References

External links

 
 
 
 

1943 films
Laurel and Hardy (film series)
American black-and-white films
1940s English-language films
Films directed by Malcolm St. Clair
1943 comedy films
20th Century Fox films
Films scored by Arthur Lange
1940s American films